Marie-Thérèse Bonnet (born 26 January 1955) is a French luger. She competed in the women's singles event at the 1976 Winter Olympics.

References

1955 births
Living people
French female lugers
Olympic lugers of France
Lugers at the 1976 Winter Olympics
Sportspeople from Isère